Tamara Ching is an American trans woman and San Francisco Bay Area transgender activist. Also known as the "God Mother of Polk [Street]", she is an advocate for trans, HIV, and sex work-related causes.

Early life and education 
Ching was born in 1949 and grew up in the Tenderloin district in San Francisco, California. She is multi-racial and has German, Hawaiian, and Chinese ancestry. Throughout her teen years, she became a sex worker as a way of survival. Ching was empowered to address the contemporary issues related to her experience as a sex worker. Suffering with diabetes and hepatitis C, she continues to do work within the transgender and sex worker community since the 1960s and strives to create a space for young trans people.

Activism 
 Transgender and commercial sex work advocacy. 
 Endorsed Proposition K during the November 2008 San Francisco general election, which did not pass.

Honors and awards 
 Honored in a Clarion Alley mural portraying trans women activists in the Mission District of San Francisco, California. Created in 2012 by Tanya Wischerath.
 Best Community Service by and Individual award, Harvey Milk LGBT Democratic Club
 Visibility Award and Volunteer of the Year, GAPA Community HIV Prevention Project
 Lifetime Achievement Commendation, CA State Senate
 Most Empowering Transgender Individual in San Francisco, Team SF

Interviews 
 Screaming Queens: The Riot at Compton's Cafeteria. A documentary by Susan Stryker.

Published work 
 Ching, Tamara. "Stranger in Paradise: Tamara Ching's Journey to the Gender Divide."  A. Magazine 3.1 (1993): 85-86

Personal life 
Ching lives in the Tenderloin district of San Francisco, where she has lived since 1992.

References 

1949 births
Living people
Date of birth missing (living people)
American people of Chinese descent
Transgender rights activists
Transgender women
LGBT people from California
American LGBT people of Asian descent
American people of German descent
Activists from San Francisco